Santo Lake is a lake in the Province of Modena, Emilia-Romagna, Italy. At an elevation of 1501 m, its surface area is 0.058 km2.

Lakes of Emilia-Romagna